Limnoporus is a genus of water striders in the family Gerridae. There are six extant described species in Limnoporus.

Species
These six current species belong to the genus Limnoporus:
 Limnoporus canaliculatus (Say, 1832)
 Limnoporus dissortis (Drake & Harris, 1930)
 Limnoporus esakii (Miyamoto, 1958)
 Limnoporus genitalis (Miyamoto, 1958)
 Limnoporus notabilis (Drake & Hottes, 1925)
 Limnoporus rufoscutellatus (Latreille, 1807)

This one extinct species is known only from fossils:
 Limnoporus wilsoni Andersen, 1998

References

Further reading

External links

 

Gerrini
Gerromorpha genera
Articles created by Qbugbot